Poncet may refer to;

Surname
 André Poncet (1755–1838), French general during the French Revolutionary Wars
 André François-Poncet (1887–1978), French diplomat
 Antonin Poncet (1849–1913), French surgeon
 Charles Poncet de Brétigny (–1644), governor of the colony of Cayenne in what is now French Guiana
 Dan Poncet (born 1953), French painter
 Jean François-Poncet (1928–2012), French politician and son of André François-Poncet  
 Joseph Poncet (1610–1675), French Jesuit missionary to Canada
 Michel Poncet de La Rivière (1671–1730), French bishop of Angers and cousin of Joseph

Other uses
 Place Antonin-Poncet, Lyon, France
 Poncet Platform, a telescope mount